Dudley Gordon Padman  OBE (16 June 1885 – 31 August 1970) was a Liberal Party politician.

Padman was born in Adelaide and educated at Bridgewater, South Australia and Prince Alfred College. He married Bertha Elizabeth Scholz in 1912 and they had a daughter and two sons. He was an alderman of Albury Council from 1930 to 1947 and Mayor from 1939 until 1945.

Padman was elected as a member of the New South Wales Legislative Assembly representing the seat of Albury in 1947, and served until 1965. He was made an OBE in 1966. He died in Albury.

References

Liberal Party of Australia members of the Parliament of New South Wales
Members of the New South Wales Legislative Assembly
Officers of the Order of the British Empire
People educated at Prince Alfred College
1885 births
1970 deaths
20th-century Australian politicians